Kantor may refer to:
 Kantor double in mathematics
 Kantor–Koecher–Tits construction in mathematics
 Kantor (surname)

See also 
 Kantorovich
 Cantor
 Cantor (disambiguation)